Expectation of the Millennium: Shi'ism in History is a book on Shia Islam co-written by Seyyed Hossein Nasr, Hamid Dabashi and Seyyed Vali Reza Nasr.

Reviews

Books by Hossein Nasr
Seyyed Hossein Nasr
Books about Islam